Maigonis is a Latvian masculine given name. Its name day is September 6.

Notable people named Maigonis 
Maigonis Valdmanis (1933—1999), Latvian basketball player

References 

Latvian masculine given names